A referendum on the resumption of European Union membership negotiations has been proposed to be held in Iceland. The referendum was suggested after the Independence Party and the Progressive Party formed a coalition government following the April 2013 parliamentary elections. The previous Social Democratic Alliance led government had suspended opening of new chapters within the accession negotiations prior to the election (the opened chapters are still negotiated about), and the incoming government vowed not to resume them unless they were first given a mandate to do so by a referendum.

Background
The then Social Democratic Alliance led government of Iceland applied to join the EU in July 2009 after the country suffered a severe financial crisis. Despite three years of negotiations, several major issues remain outstanding, including the Common Fisheries Policy.  On 14 January, the Icelandic government announced that negotiations would be suspended until after the parliamentary election in April. No new chapters will be opened prior to the election, though negotiations will continue on chapters that have already been opened.  The ruling left-wing parties suffered a major defeat in the elections, while the centrist Progressive Party had a large victory.

The leaders of the Progressive Party and the Independence Party, which both oppose Icelandic EU membership, announced on 22 May 2013 that a coalition platform had been reached that would suspend all accession talks with the EU and not resume them unless first approved by a referendum.  The advisor to Sigmundur Davíð Gunnlaugsson, the incoming Prime Minister, stated that "later in the term there will be a referendum on whether Iceland should continue the talks, although no date has been decided."  The new Finance Minister Bjarni Benediktsson stated that "We believe the accession talks were started without the necessary support in Iceland. We will not go further with the talks. We also have to listen to what the EU has to say about our approach; maybe it will make no sense to hold a referendum"

On 22 February, the governing parties agreed to formally withdraw the membership application, without first holding a referendum on the matter, and submitted a bill to parliament seeking their approval to do so.  However, on February 25, Ragnheiður Ríkharðsdóttir, Chairman of the Independence Party parliamentarian group, announced her intention to not vote in favour of the proposal.

The Independence/Progressive coalition lost its majority in the 2016 Icelandic parliamentary election. After several failed attempts to form a government from alternative combinations, a new coalition was formed in January 2017, led by the Independence party and joined by Regeneration and Bright Future, both of whom support EU membership and the former of whom was originally a splinter movement that left the Independence party over this very issue. The coalition deal included a pledge to hold a parliamentary vote on whether to hold an EU membership referendum.

On 21 March 2022, party leaders from the Social Democratic Alliance, the Pirate Party, and the Reform Party, have submitted their proposals to the Althing that an EU membership referendum be held before the end of 2022.

On 15 September 2022, the three party leaders from those parties made a draft question to the referendum: "Do you want Iceland to take up the matter in negotiations with the European Union with the aim of concluding a membership agreement that would be submitted to the nation for approval or rejection? Answer options would be yes or no."

On 20 September, the leader of the Social Democratic Alliance, Logi Már Einarsson, wrote a speech for Icelandic President Guðni Th. Jóhannesson requesting the referendum before the end of 2023.

Public opinion

In May 2013 voter support for joining the European Union was at 25%.  A poll released in January 2014 found that 67.5% of Icelanders support holding a referendum on the continuation of accession negotiations.  The government's decision in late February to withdraw Iceland's membership application without a referendum led to thousands of protesters taking to the streets outside of the Parliament buildings in Reykjavik.  By 28 February 2014, 82% were in favour of holding the referendum.  , 53,555 people (22.1% of Iceland's voters) had signed a petition demanding that the promised referendum be held. A Gallup poll conducted in the early days of the 2022 Russian invasion of Ukraine indicated a plurality of support among Icelanders (47%) for joining the European Union.

See also 
 Iceland–European Union relations

References

Referendums in Iceland
Referendums related to European Union accession
Proposed referendums